Punta de Agua is an unincorporated community and census-designated place (CDP) in Torrance County, New Mexico, United States. It was first listed as a CDP prior to the 2020 census.

The Quarai unit of Salinas Pueblo Missions National Monument is in the southwest part of the CDP.

Demographics

Education
Its school district is Mountainair Public Schools.

References 

Census-designated places in Torrance County, New Mexico
Census-designated places in New Mexico